William Hewitt may refer to:
W. A. Hewitt (1875–1966), Canadian sports executive and journalist
William Alexander Hewitt, former executive at John Deere
William Hewitt (minister) (born 1951), Moderator of the General Assembly of the Church of Scotland
William Henry Hewitt, South African recipient of the Victoria Cross
William Hewitt (cricketer) (1795–1870), English cricketer
William Wells Hewitt (1898–1966), English organist and composer

See also
Bill Hewitt (disambiguation)
William Hewett (disambiguation)
William Hewlett